The Auditor General for Wales is the public official in charge of the Wales Audit Office, the body responsible for auditing the Welsh Government, its public bodies, National Health Service bodies and local government in Wales. The Auditor General for Wales is responsible for auditing £20 billion of taxpayers' money each year.

It is a statutory appointment made by Her Majesty the Queen, in accordance with the provisions of Schedule 8 to the Government of Wales Act 2006.

The first full-time Auditor General for Wales, Jeremy Colman, was appointed on 1 April 2005 for an initial 5-year term subsequently extended in 2009 for a further 3 years. Colman resigned in February 2010 after an internal investigation at the Wales Audit Office and subsequently pleaded guilty to possession of indecent images of children.

Interim Auditor General, Gillian Body, took responsibility for running the Office prior to the appointment of Huw Vaughan Thomas, from 1 October 2010.

Notes

External links
 Official site

Wales
Economy of Wales
Government of Wales
Auditing in the United Kingdom